This page list topics (arranged alphabetically) related to the Republic of Artsakh and Nagorno-Karabakh region.



#
1991 Nagorno-Karabakh independence referendum
1991 Nagorno-Karabakh parliamentary election
1995 Nagorno-Karabakh parliamentary election
1996 Nagorno-Karabakh presidential election
1997 Nagorno-Karabakh presidential election
2000 Nagorno-Karabakh parliamentary election
2015 Nagorno-Karabakh parliamentary election
2016 Nagorno-Karabakh conflict
2017 Nagorno-Karabakh constitutional referendum
2020 Artsakhian general election
2020 Nagorno-Karabakh war
2020 Nagorno-Karabakh ceasefire agreement
2022 Artsakh blockade

A
Administrative divisions of the Republic of Artsakh
Afatlu
Arayik Harutyunyan
Armenia
Armenia–Artsakh relations
Armenians
Armenian Apostolic Church
Armenian-occupied territories surrounding Nagorno-Karabakh
Armenian dram
Armenian language
Armenian Revolutionary Federation
Artsakh
Artsakh Air
Artsakhbank
Artsakh Conservative Party
Artsakh Defense Army
Artsakh dram
Artsakh Freedom Party
Artsakh University
Artsakh passport
Artur Mkrtchyan
Artsakh Public TV
Artsakh Republican Party
Artsakh Revolutionary Party
Artsakh State Museum
Artsakh State University
Artsakh–Transnistria relations
Artsakh–United States relations
Artsakh Wine Fest
Azat Artsakh
Azat u ankakh Artsakh
Azerbaijan
Azerbaijani administrative divisions of Nagorno-Karabakh
Azerbaijani Community of Nagorno-Karabakh

B
Bako Sahakyan
Bishkek Protocol

C
Capture of Shusha
Chartar (town)
Climate of Nagorno-Karabakh
Coat of arms of the Republic of Artsakh
Communications in Nagorno-Karabakh
Communist Party of Artsakh
Community for Democracy and Rights of Nations
Constitution of the Republic of Artsakh
Culture of Artsakh

D
Dadivank Monastery
Democratic Party of Artsakh
Demographics of the Republic of Artsakh

E
Elections in Artsakh
Economy of the Republic of Artsakh

F
First Nagorno-Karabakh War
Flag of the Republic of Artsakh
Foreign relations of Artsakh
Free Motherland
Free Motherland - UCA Alliance

G
Generation of Independence Party
Ghazanchetsots Cathedral

H
History of Artsakh
History of Nagorno-Karabakh (1915–1923)

I
Identity and Unity Party

J
Janapar
Justice (Artsakh)

K
Karabakh Khanate
Karabakh Open
Karabakh Council

L
Lachin
Lachin corridor
Karabakh carpet
Land mine situation in Nagorno Karabakh
Law enforcement in the Republic of Artsakh
Leonard Petrosyan

M
Mardakert (disambiguation)
Miatsum
Military history of the Nagorno-Karabakh Republic
Ministry of Internal Affairs (Artsakh)
Movement 88
Music of Artsakh

N
Nagorno-Karabakh Autonomous Oblast
Nagorno-Karabakh conflict
Nagorno-Karabakh constitutional referendum, 2006
Nagorno-Karabakh parliamentary election, 2005
Nagorno-Karabakh parliamentary election, 2010
Nagorno-Karabakh presidential election, 2007
Nagorno-Karabakh presidential election, 2002
National Assembly of the Republic of Artsakh
National Revival (Artsakh)
New Artsakh Alliance

O
OSCE Minsk Group
Organization for Security and Co-operation in Europe
Outline of the Republic of Artsakh

P
Peace and Development Party (Artsakh)
Political status of Artsakh
Politics of Artsakh
Post-Soviet conflicts
Post-Soviet states
President of Artsakh
President of the National Assembly of Artsakh
Prime Minister of Artsakh
Public holidays in the Republic of Artsakh

Q

R
Religion in Artsakh
Robert Kocharyan

S
Self-determination
Shusha
Social Justice Party (Nagorno Karabakh)
South Caucasus
Soviet Union
Stepanakert
Stepanakert Airport
Stepanakert Memorial
Karen Grigory Sargsyan

T
Tehran Communiqué
Timeline of Artsakh history
Tomorrow Artsakh
Tourism in the Republic of Artsakh
Transcaucasia

U
United Armenia Party
United Civic Alliance Party
United Motherland
United Nations Security Council Resolution 822
United Nations Security Council Resolution 853
United Nations Security Council Resolution 874
United Nations Security Council Resolution 884

V
Visa policy of Artsakh
Visa requirements for Artsakh citizens

W
We Are Our Mountains
Women in Nagorno-Karabakh

X

Y
Yerits Mankants Monastery

Z
Zheleznovodsk Communiqué

Lists
List of airports in Nagorno-Karabakh
List of Armenians from Nagorno-Karabakh
List of Azerbaijanis from Nagorno-Karabakh
List of cities and towns in Artsakh
List of companies of the Republic of Artsakh
List of forts in Artsakh
List of newspapers in Nagorno-Karabakh
List of political parties in Artsakh
List of universities in Artsakh
List of representative offices of Artsakh
List of states with limited recognition
List of twin towns and sister cities in the Republic of Artsakh

See also
Index of Armenia-related articles
Lists of country-related topics - similar lists for other countries
Outline of the Republic of Artsakh

Armenia-related lists
Azerbaijan-related lists
Indexes of topics by country